Diego Luis Braghieri (born 23 February 1987) is an Argentine football defender who plays for Argentinian club Lanús.

Career
Braghieri began playing in the Rosario Central youth development system. He made his debut for the first team in a Primera División match against Estudiantes de La Plata on 24 March 2007. He scored his first goal for the club in a 3–0 home win against Arsenal de Sarandí on 17 September 2008.

In July 2011, Braghieri joined Lanús on loan for one year. He then joined Arsenal de Sarandí where he played for two years. In June 2014, he signed for Lanús on a permanent basis.

References

External links
 
 
 Daniel Argentine Primera statistics at Futbol XXI 

1987 births
Living people
Argentine footballers
Argentine expatriate footballers
People from Belgrano Department, Santa Fe
Argentine people of Italian descent
Association football defenders
Rosario Central footballers
Club Atlético Lanús footballers
Arsenal de Sarandí footballers
Atlético Nacional footballers
Club Tijuana footballers
San Lorenzo de Almagro footballers
Argentine Primera División players
Primera Nacional players
Liga MX players
Categoría Primera A players
Argentine expatriate sportspeople in Mexico
Argentine expatriate sportspeople in Colombia
Expatriate footballers in Mexico
Expatriate footballers in Colombia
Sportspeople from Santa Fe Province